Aukrug is a former Amt ("collective municipality") in the district of Rendsburg-Eckernförde, in Schleswig-Holstein, Germany. The seat of the Amt is in Aukrug. It was disbanded on 1 January 2012 along with the Hanerau-Hademarschen, the Amt Hohenwestedt-Land and Hohenwestedt to become Mittelholstein.

The Amt Aukrug consisted of the following municipalities:

Arpsdorf 
Aukrug
Ehndorf 
Padenstedt

Former Ämter in Schleswig-Holstein